"Candle in the Wind" is a threnody written by English musician Elton John and songwriter Bernie Taupin, and performed by John. It was originally written in 1973, in honour of Marilyn Monroe, who had died 11 years earlier.

In 1997, John performed a rewritten version of the song, "Candle in the Wind 1997", as a tribute to Diana, Princess of Wales. In 2004, Rolling Stone Magazine listed the original version of the song at No. 347 of its 500 greatest songs of all time.

Original version
The original version, which is in the key of E major appeared on John's 1973 album Goodbye Yellow Brick Road and was released as a single in 1974. The lyrics of the song are a sympathetic portrayal of the life of Marilyn Monroe. The song's opening line "Goodbye, Norma Jean" refers to Monroe's real name, Norma Jeane (more commonly spelled Jean) Baker. Taupin was inspired to write the lyrics after hearing the phrase "candle in the wind" used by Clive Davis in tribute to Janis Joplin: "I just kept hearing this term [and] I thought, what a great way of describing someone’s life". 

In the Eagle Vision Classic Albums documentary on the making of Goodbye Yellow Brick Road, Taupin said the song is about "the idea of fame or youth or somebody being cut short in the prime of their life. The song could have been about James Dean, it could have been about Montgomery Clift, it could have been about Jim Morrison ... how we glamorise death, how we immortalise people." Taupin has noted that the theory about him being a "rabid Marilyn Monroe fanatic" has been a common misconception: "It's not that I didn't have respect for her. It's just that the song could just as easily have been about James Dean or Jim Morrison, Kurt Cobain, Sylvia Plath, Virginia Woolf. I mean, basically, anybody, any writer, actor, actress, or musician who died young and sort of became this iconic picture of Dorian Gray, that thing where they simply stopped aging. It's a beauty frozen in time". In an interview with Rolling Stone in 2014, Taupin disputed the implication that he was a Monroe fan: "She is absolutely not someone I admired a lot as a kid or anything. She was just a metaphor for fame and dying young, and people sort of overdoing the indulgence, and those that do die young". On the song itself, he stated: "I think it's one of the best marriages of lyric and melody that Elton and I have ever put together. But it doesn’t change the fact that I wasn’t particularly enamored by Marilyn Monroe".

The single release of the original song reached No. 11 in the UK charts in 1974. At the time, it was not released as a single in the United States as "Bennie and the Jets" was chosen instead.

Legacy
This version was ranked No. 347 on Rolling Stones list of The 500 Greatest Songs of All Time in 2004. In 2010, the ranking dropped to No. 356.

During a concert on 7 April 1990 at Farm Aid IV, John dedicated the song to Ryan White, who had been suffering from AIDS. White died of AIDS complications the next day. John performed the song "Skyline Pigeon" at White's funeral.

Personnel
 Elton John – piano, lead vocals
 Davey Johnstone – electric guitar, acoustic guitar, backing vocals
 Dee Murray – bass guitar, backing vocals
 Nigel Olsson – drums, backing vocals

Certifications

1986 live version
On 14 December 1986, a live version of the song was recorded in Sydney, Australia. This version features only Elton backing himself on the piano, and atmospheric keyboard textures and bass pedals, which were played by Elton via MIDI and keyboardist Fred Mandel. It was released in 1987 on the album Live in Australia with the Melbourne Symphony Orchestra and as a single.

In 1988, it reached number five on the UK Singles Chart and number six on the US Billboard Hot 100 making a return for John to chart inside the Top 40 in both countries after "Heartache All Over the World" and "Slow Rivers", two of his singles from his 20th album in 1986, Leather Jackets failed to reach the top 40 on each country.

Despite problems with his vocal cords at the time, the performance also earned John a Grammy nomination in 1988 for Best Male Pop Vocal Performance.

Personnel
Elton John: Lead vocals, Piano
Fred Mandel: Keyboards

AccoladesGrammy Awards'''

|-
|  style="width:35px; text-align:center;" |1988 || | "Candle in the Wind (live 1986)" || Best Pop Vocal Performance – Male || 
|-

Year-end charts

1997 version

"Candle in the Wind 1997" or "Goodbye England's Rose" was a new recording of "Candle in the Wind", with new lyrics, written and recorded as a tribute to Diana, Princess of Wales. Released in September 1997, the song peaked at No. 1 in the United Kingdom, becoming John's fourth No. 1 single. It also peaked at No. 1 in several other countries. This version was produced by George Martin. Guinness World Records lists this version as the second-best selling single in the world, with 33 million copies sold  and as the highest-selling single since charts began in the 1950s.

2003 acoustic remix
Using the same vocal take as the original 1973 recording, engineer Greg Penny stripped away all instrumentation except Davey Johnstone's acoustic guitar. Even the double-tracking of the lead vocal was removed, leaving Elton and the original backing vocal arrangement of Dee Murray, Nigel Olsson and Davey Johnstone. The remix first appeared as a bonus track on the 30th Anniversary edition of Goodbye Yellow Brick Road and subsequently on the 2003 EP Remixed''.

Live performances
From its release until in 1984, John heavily performed this song with his band. On 1985 onwards, John played it solo mostly at the encore of his concerts and he rarely played this song with the band since then.

References

1974 singles
1987 singles
Elton John songs
Songs with music by Elton John
Songs with lyrics by Bernie Taupin
Songs about fame
Songs about Marilyn Monroe
1970s ballads
Song recordings produced by Gus Dudgeon
1973 songs
DJM Records singles
MCA Records singles
Pop ballads